The Olympia Eisschnellaufbahn is a speed skating venue located in Innsbruck, Austria. The outdoor venue hosted the speed skating events both for the 1964 and the 1976 Winter Olympics and the 2012 Winter Youth Olympics.

It is part of the OlympiaWorld Innsbruck consortium that is responsible for maintaining venues that hosted both the 1964 and the 1976 Winter Olympics.

References
1964 Winter Olympics official report. p. 142. 
1976 Winter Olympics official report. pp. 205–7. 
Official website. 

Venues of the 1964 Winter Olympics
Venues of the 1976 Winter Olympics
Olympic speed skating venues
Speed skating venues in Austria
Venues of the 2012 Winter Youth Olympics
Sports venues in Tyrol (state)
Buildings and structures in Innsbruck
Sport in Innsbruck